Victoria—Haliburton was a provincial electoral district in central Ontario, Canada which elected members to the Legislative Assembly of Ontario. It was created in 1967 and abolished in 1999 into Haliburton—Kawartha Lakes—Brock and Parry Sound—Muskoka.

Boundaries
The riding was created in 1934 and consisted of the counties of Victoria and Haliburton. In 1967, the riding was renamed as Victoria-Haliburton and consisted of the counties of Victoria and Haliburton, the town of Lindsay and the villages of Bobcaygeon, Fenelon Falls, Omemee, Sturgeon Point and Woodville, and the Improvement District of Bicroft. In 1975, the boundaries were redefined as only including the counties of Victoria and Haliburton. In 1986, the riding was changed slightly to exclude the township of Manvers.

In 1996, a major electoral riding redistribution occurred which abolished the riding. Overall 130 seats were reduced to 103 which harmonized the provincial riding boundaries with those of the already existing federal ridings. The riding was dissolved into the new ridings of Haliburton—Kawartha Lakes—Brock and Parry Sound—Muskoka.

Members of Provincial Parliament

This riding elected the following members of the Legislative Assembly of Ontario:

References

Former provincial electoral districts of Ontario